The 1929 AAA Championship Car season consisted of five races, beginning in Speedway, Indiana on May 30 and concluding in Tyrone, Pennsylvania on September 2.  There were also three non-championship races.  The AAA National Champion was Louis Meyer and the Indianapolis 500 winner was Ray Keech.

Schedule and results
All races running on Dirt/Brick/Board Oval.

 Scheduled for 100 miles
 Scheduled for 200 miles, stopped due to fatal wreck involving then-leader Ray Keech.  AAA rules stated that no car involved in a wreck could score points, so the win reverted to Louis Meyer.

Leading National Championship standings

† Keech was killed in an accident at the June 15 race at Altoona.

References

See also
 1929 Indianapolis 500

AAA Championship Car season
AAA Championship Car
1929 in American motorsport